William Edwards Stevenson (October 25, 1900 – April 2, 1985) was an American track and field athlete, lawyer and diplomat, who won the gold medal in the 4 × 400 metres relay at the 1924 Summer Olympics, and later served as the president of Oberlin College.

Biography

Early life and education

He was a graduate of Andover and Princeton University before winning a Rhodes Scholarship to Oxford University, where he studied law.

Legal career
After returning to United States, he was an assistant U.S. attorney for the southern district of New York in the 1920s and, in 1931, founded the prominent New York law partnership of Debevoise, Stevenson, Plimpton and Page, now Debevoise & Plimpton L.L.P.

1924 Summer Olympics 
At the Paris Olympics, Stevenson ran the second leg on the American 4 × 400 meters relay team, which won the gold medal with a new world record of 3.16.0. His teammates were Commodore Cochran, Oliver MacDonald and Alan Helffrich.

World War II
During the World War II, Stevenson and his wife, Eleanor "Bumpie" Bumstead Stevenson, a 1923 graduate of Smith College, organized and administered American Red Cross operations in Great Britain, North Africa, Sicily, and Italy. Both he and his wife were awarded the Bronze Star for meritorious achievement in support of military operations. (Eleanor Stevenson was the author of I Knew Your Soldier in 1946. She was active in the civil rights movement and the first person to give a nationally broadcast speech on behalf of Planned Parenthood.)

President of Oberlin College
In 1946, Stevenson succeeded Ernest Hatch Wilkins as a president of Oberlin College. He held the post until 1960.

Ambassador
In 1962 John F. Kennedy appointed him as an ambassador to Philippines, where he served until 1965. He then became the head of the Aspen Institute of Humanistic Studies in Colorado.

Death
Stevenson died in Fort Myers, Florida, aged 84.

Personal life
In 1937, Stevenson bought Buttonwood Manor in the North Stamford section of  Stamford, Connecticut, an 1809 Colonial-style house. When Stevenson and his wife went to England during World War II, they rented the house to Dorothy Fields, a renowned lyricist, according to the columnist and war correspondent Ernie Pyle.

He was the father of U.S. Representative Helen Stevenson Meyner, who served for two terms, from 1975 to 1979. She was the wife of two-term New Jersey Gov. Robert B. Meyner. His other daughter, Priscilla, married Richard Hunt, a Harvard professor and the university's marshal. He was also a cousin of the Vice-President Adlai E. Stevenson, presidential candidate Adlai Stevenson, Senator Adlai Stevenson III, and actor McLean Stevenson.

See also
 List of Princeton University Olympians

References

1900 births
1985 deaths
Track and field athletes from Chicago
New York (state) lawyers
American male sprinters
Presidents of Oberlin College
Ambassadors of the United States to the Philippines
Olympic gold medalists for the United States in track and field
Athletes (track and field) at the 1924 Summer Olympics
American Rhodes Scholars
Princeton University alumni
Medalists at the 1924 Summer Olympics
20th-century American lawyers
20th-century American diplomats
20th-century American academics